This is a list of the Albania national football team results from 1946 through 1969.

1940s

1946

1947

1948

1949

1950s

1950

1952

1953

1957

1958

1960s

1963

1964

1965

1967

References

Albania national football team results